Kalahari language may refer to:

the Bantu Kgalagadi language
one of the Kalahari Khoe languages